"Love's a Loaded Gun" is a song by American rock singer Alice Cooper, taken from the 1991 album Hey Stoopid. The single managed to peak at No. 38 in the UK and No. 31 on the Mainstream Rock Tracks chart. It was one of three singles released from the album (the other two being "Hey Stoopid" and "Feed My Frankenstein") that launched "Hey Stoopid" into the top 40.

The single featured a B-Side, a cover of Jimi Hendrix's "Fire".

Personnel
Alice Cooper - vocals, harmonica
Mickey Curry - drums
Stef Burns - guitar
Hugh McDonald - bass
John Webster - keyboards
Robert Bailey - keyboards

Chart positions

References

1991 songs
1991 singles
Songs written by Alice Cooper
Alice Cooper songs
Epic Records singles
Songs written by Jack Ponti
Song recordings produced by Peter Collins (record producer)
Glam metal ballads
Glam metal songs